Mawatari is a Japanese surname. Notable people with the surname include:

, Japanese footballer
Junki Mawatari (born 1996), Japanese footballer 
Kazuaki Mawatari (born 1991), Japanese footballer 
Matsuko Mawatari (born 1967), Japanese pop singer-songwriter 
Tatsuharu Mawatari (born 1957), Japanese politician
Yuki Mawatari (born 1909), Japanese swimmer 

Japanese-language surnames